

Events

April event
 April 19 – Stockton and Darlington Railway is authorised by the Parliament of the United Kingdom.

November event
 November – Henry Robinson Palmer patents a monorail system in England.

Births

May births
 May 8 – William Henry Vanderbilt, son of Cornelius Vanderbilt and president of the New York Central system (d. 1885).

August births
 August 10 – Jay Cooke, financier who built the Northern Pacific Railway (d. 1905).
 August 17 – John Saxby, English railway signalling engineer (d. 1913).

October births
 October 21 - Collis P. Huntington, a member of The Big Four group of financiers in California (d. 1900).

December births
 December 17 - Frederick W. Lander, Chief Civil Engineer for the Pacific Railroad (d. 1862).

Deaths

Jack Kalfus

References